The Inventory of Conflict and Environment (ICE) is a project initiated by Jim Lee, School of International Service (SIS) at American University in Washington, D.C. He has also written extensively on environment and conflict, including the book "Hot and Cold Wars".  The ICE project makes use of case research and computer applications in international relations research.  The cases can be searched through a pattern matching tool.  ICE establishes a perspective in which disaggregated data is combined with geographic information in the study of conflicts.

ICE Case studies are sets of categorical research projects meant to spur further research in specific areas of international dispute.  The ICE cases are related to the Trade and Environment Database project (TED). Since 1991, the TED and ICE projects have produced over a range of case study projects.  ICE has about 300 cases.  Among the practical uses of such case studies, ICE provides information on environmental refugees, conflict dimensions, countries involved and related issues.  ICE case studies have been of interest in both research and policy arenas.  The ICE cases can be found HERE.

Conflict and environment are modern and age-old problems and the cases represent this continuum of impact.  The history of conflict and environment dates back many thousands of years.  AT the root of these cases are control over resources and migrations of peoples.  These two drivers will remain at the core of environmental conflict cases, now and in the future.

ICE Cases and the ICE Search Engine
ICE project is an evolving search engine and a tool for looking at international conflicts in the context of events and in contexts of similar and/or different typologies. It is also a tool for scenario creation for analyzing new cases.  Several researchers, students  and universities have been part of the ICE project.  It is the product of melding together approaches to the separate fields of environment and conflict studies.

The ICE system identifies the elements of conflict as aspects of a parsed scenario.  Using ICE, an evaluation of any specific event or series of events facilitates consideration of an array of factors.  These factors include several types of information, including general, environmental, conflict, and decisions.  These are represented by a series of indicators grouped into basket of categories.  These factors are also searchable items on the search engine.

Environment Indicators
 Continent  
 Region  
 Country  
 Habitat  
 Environ Problem  
 Scope 
Conflict Indicators 
 Trigger  
 Type  
 Outcome  
 Conflict Level  
 Time Period  
 Duration
 

The "inferential" ICE search engine offers a pattern matching system and an additional weighting component for the researcher's evaluation and analysis.  The Ice Search and Create Scenario Tool  is an upgraded version with more user options.  The SST lets the user imagine new cases, input relevant attributes and see how it compares to other ICE cases.  These scenarios come with a simple automated case analysis and can be saved or results downloaded.

Notes

References
 Franzel, Joshua and James Lee.  "Inventory Building and Utilization with Information Technologies: The Use of Database and Pattern Matching Systems in Teaching and Research", The Innovation Journal: The Public Sector Innovation Journal, Vol. 11, No. 3, pp. 1–8. 2005.
 James R. Lee, Climate Change and Armed Conflict: Hot and Cold Wars, Routledge, 2009 
 James R. Lee, "A Brief History of Climate Change and Conflict", Bulletin of the Atomic Scientists, 14 August 2009
 James R. Lee, Environmental Conflict and Cooperation, Routledge, 2019

External links
 Inventory of Conflict and Environment website
 Trade & Environment Database (TED)
 United Nations Environment Programme (UNEP), post-crisis assessment
 Environemtnal Conflict and Cooperation 

American University
International relations
Research institutes in the Netherlands
1984 establishments in Washington, D.C.